Sheer Elegance was a British pop/soul trio, comprising Dennis Robinson, Bev Gordon (ex-Earthquake, aka Little Henry) and Herbie Watkins, who appeared on the British television talent show New Faces in 1975. Their first single, "Going Downtown", was a flop, but their second single, "Milky Way", reached number 18 in the UK Singles Chart early in 1976. The follow-up, "Life Is Too Short Girl", was more successful, reaching number 9 and spending nine weeks in the chart. Their final hit was "It's Temptation" which reached number 41 in the same year. The following release, "Dance the Night Away", failed to chart in 1977. Their only album was titled Sheer Elegance.

Discography

Albums
 Sheer Elegance (ABC Records, 1976)

Singles

References

British soul musical groups